Reunions is the seventh studio album released by Jason Isbell, and the fourth accompanied by his backing band The 400 Unit. It was released first in independent record stores on May 8, 2020, through Southeastern Records, intended to help small businesses amid the COVID-19 pandemic. It received a wide release a week later on May 15, 2020. The songs "Be Afraid", "What've I Done to Help", and "Only Children" were released as singles prior to the album's release. Reunions peaked at number 9 on the US Billboard 200 chart.

Background
Isbell noted that the common thread throughout the album is reunions with ghosts both living and dead, from his past life. He told Vinyl Me, Please Magazine "there’s ghosts all over the record, and that’s why I called it Reunions, because that’s what a ghost is: reuniting with somebody long enough for them to tell you what you missed the first time around."

In an interview with NPR music, he elaborated that "initially, I was just trying to write a bunch of good songs and I think that's always how it starts for me...What happened with this record: after I wrote a couple songs, I started noticing patterns. I started seeing the fact that I was going back in time and reconnecting, at least on a psychological level, with a lot of the people, a lot of the relationships that I had growing up and when I was younger and before I got sober. I got sober eight and a half years ago. For a long spell, between the time when I got sober and just the last couple years, it was really difficult for me to revisit those times in a way that was anything less than judgmental. Because I had to look back at myself with disdain and not risk turning back into the person I used to be."

Songs like "Only Children" and "Dreamsicle" take a bittersweet look back at Isbell's childhood, while "Be Afraid" and "What've I Done To Help" address current events and political anxiety in the United States. "It Gets Easier" explicitly addresses the struggles of his newfound sobriety with the refrain "it gets easier, but it never gets easy." He told NPR that song "is about looking at this from a perspective of time, and the fact that the song happens to a person who isn't recently sober, somebody who's been working on it for a while."

Critical reception

Reunions was met with universal acclaim reviews from critics. At Metacritic, which assigns a weighted average rating out of 100 to reviews from mainstream publications, this release received an average score of 82, based on 15 reviews.

AllMusic gave the album 4.5 out of 5 stars and commented on how the album seemed to address the anxiety and unrest resulting from the COVID-19 pandemic despite being written before it began. "The fact these songs seem so telling in a strange and difficult time has a bit to do with coincidence, but more important is the excellence of Isbell's songwriting," they wrote. In his Substack-published "Consumer Guide" column, Robert Christgau highlighted the songs "It Gets Easier" and "What've I Done to Help?" while writing in summation of the album: "Lest anyone think he’s full of himself, this brave, soulful, articulate Nashville conscience singer turns the high beam on his own moral shortcomings".

Accolades

Track listing
All tracks written by Jason Isbell except where noted.

Credits
The 400 Unit
Jimbo Hart - Bass
Jason Isbell - Vocals, Guitars, Piano
Chad Gamble - Drums, Tambourine
Amanda Shires - Fiddle, Background Vocals
Sadler Vaden - Guitars
Derry Deborja - Keyboards, Omnichord, Organ, Piano

Guest Vocalists
Jay Buchanan - Background Vocals
David Crosby - Background Vocals

Production and Design
Pete Lyman - Mastering
Dave Cobb - Mixing, Producer, Shaker
Fetzer Design - Art Direction
Toby Hurlbert - Assistant Engineer
Daniel Bacigalupi - Assistant
Paul James Butler - Composer
Michael Kiwanuka - Composer
Gena Johnson - Engineer

Charts

Weekly charts

Year-end charts

References

Jason Isbell albums
2020 albums